Mahabali is a 1983 Indian Malayalam-language film, directed by J. Sasikumar and produced by E. K. Thyagarajan. The film stars Prem Nazir, Jayabharathi, Adoor Bhasi and Unnimary in the lead roles. The film has musical score by M. K. Arjunan.

Plot

Cast
Prem Nazir
Jayabharathi
Adoor Bhasi
Unnimary
M. G. Soman
T. G. Ravi

Soundtrack
The music was composed by M. K. Arjunan and the lyrics were written by Pappanamkodu Lakshmanan.

References

External links
 

1983 films
1980s Malayalam-language films